The Perry McAdow House is a Renaissance Revival house located at 4605 Cass Avenue in Midtown Detroit, Michigan. It was designated a Michigan State Historic Site in 1976 and added to the National Register of Historic Places in 1980.

History
Clara McAdow married her first husband, Dr. C. E. Tomlinson, in Jackson, Michigan. moved to Coulson, Montana, where Clara got a job with the Northern Pacific Railroad, and was able to move to a position of responsibility unusual for a woman at the time. She met Perry W. McAdow through her real estate trading, and married him in 1884. Perry was given the opportunity to buy a stake in the Spotted Horse mine with Snookum Joe Anderson, but wasn't interested in mining. When Anderson wanted to move on, Clara took over the business, buying it for $11,000. After two years, the mine was producing about 75 ounces of gold a day. She sold it in 1890 to investors from Helena, Montana, for $500,000.

The couple returned to Detroit, and in 1891, they built an elaborate mansion on Cass for a cost of $65,000 as an entrance into Detroit society. The couple lived there until 1897.  The house was used as a private residence until 1913, when it was sold to the First Universalist congregation. The church used it as a place of worship for three years until a new church immediately to the north was completed, after which the house was used as a parish house.

Architecture
The house has two and a half stories with a hipped roof, and is constructed of red brick and brownstone. The exterior boasts bay windows, Corinthian columned porches, parapet balustrades, and a modillion cornice; the interior features notable frescos, paneling, plasterwork and stained glass. Behind the original house is a two-story, red brick church hall, built in 1917.

References

Further reading

Culture of Detroit
Historic district contributing properties in Michigan
Houses completed in 1891
Houses in Detroit
Michigan State Historic Sites in Wayne County, Michigan
National Register of Historic Places in Wayne County, Michigan
Renaissance Revival architecture in Michigan